Viktor Andersson, born 28 September 1982, is a Swedish floorball player. Being a defender, he has represented several club teams, and played in the SSL. His first club is Hagaboda SK.

Clubs
Throughout the years, he has represented the following clubs:

1995/1996 - Fagerhult Habo IBK Ungdom, Sweden
1995/96 - 1998/99 - Fagerhult Habo IBK, Sweden
1999/00-2001/02 - Mullsjö AIS, Sweden
2001/2002-2003/04 - Jönköpings IK, Sweden
2003/2004-2004/2005 - Fagerhult Habo IBK, Sweden
2005/2006-2006/07 - Jönköpings IK, Sweden
2007/08 - Basel Magic, Switzerland
2008/09 - 2009/2010 - Mullsjö AIS, Sweden
2010/11 - Fagerhult Habo IBK, Sweden
2011/2012-2013/2014 - IBK Landskrona, Sweden

References

1982 births
Living people
Swedish floorball players
21st-century Swedish people